Genoud may refer to:

People with the surname
Antoine Eugène Genoud (1792–1849), French Roman Catholic theologian and politician
Bernard Genoud (1942–2010), French Roman Catholic Bishop
François Genoud (1915–1996), Swiss financier
Philippe Morier-Genoud, French theatre and film actor